= Plantum =

Plant identification mobile application

- Developer: AIBY Inc.
- Initial release: August 22, 2019 (iOS), September 21, 2020 (Android)
- Operating system: iOS 16.0+, Android 12+
- Platform: iOS, Android
- Type: Plant identification, plant care
- License: Freemium
- Website: myplantum.com

Plantum is a mobile application developed by AIBY Inc. that uses artificial intelligence to identify plants, assist with the diagnosis of plant health problems, and provide care recommendations. The app is available for iOS and Android devices, with a freemium model, and supports multiple languages. It has been featured in technology and consumer media for its plant identification and plant care tools.

== History ==
Plantum, originally released under the name NatureID, launched on iOS on August 22, 2019, and later became available on Android on September 21, 2020. By 2020, the app included plant disease diagnosis tools and automated care reminder features. Later updates introduced additional tools such as a built-in light meter and access to botanist consultation services.

In 2023, the app was rebranded from NatureID to Plantum. Version 6.0 also introduced a programme providing free premium access to students and educators. That same year, Plantum received the Gold Award for Best Mobile App from the Best Mobile App Awards. Plantum has been featured on Google Play in more than 170 countries across categories, including Education, Discover, and Science, and has surpassed 20 million downloads across platforms by 2025.

== Features ==
Plantum provides plant identification for more than 33,000 species, along with disease diagnosis and plant care guidance. Additional features include a plant journal, encyclopedia, light and pot measurement tools, search filters, and local weather tracking. The app also offers online consultations with professional botanists. The app is available for iOS 16.0 or later and Android 12 or later, and supports multiple languages, including English, Spanish, Portuguese, German, French, Italian, Japanese, and Chinese (Simplified and Traditional).
